Gilhooley, Gilhoolie or Gilhooly may refer to:

Gilhooley

 Frank Gilhooley (1892-1959), American baseball player
 Maria Gilhooley, singer
 Ray Gilhooley (1887-1973), American racecar driver

Gilhooly
 Brenda Gilhooly (born 1964), English comedian
 David Gilhooly (1943–2013), American ceramic artist  
 James Gilhooly (1847-1916), Irish Nationalist politician
 
Gilhoolie
 Gilhoolie, a jar opener